The Mercedes-Benz EQC (N293) is a battery electric compact luxury crossover SUV produced by Mercedes-Benz since 2019. It is the first member of the battery electric Mercedes EQ family.

History 
The EQC is based on the Generation EQ concept that was unveiled at the 2016 Paris Motor Show. The final production version was revealed in Sweden on 4 September 2018, and publicly debuted at the 2018 Paris Motor Show.

Design 
The EQC is based on the GLC and shares the same wheelbase dimensions.

The EQC400 4MATIC is powered by 2 asynchronous electric motors, fitted on the front and rear axles, and produces .

The 80 kWh battery pack has a modular design and consists of 384 lithium-ion cells. It can be charged from 10 to 80 per cent in 40 minutes, via a DC fast charger.

Steering wheel paddle shifters allow for the selection of varying levels of brake energy regeneration.

Equipment 
Standard equipment includes 19-inch alloy wheels, automatic collision avoidance, and two 10.25-inch interior displays for the instrument cluster and infotainment system. All models feature the Mercedes-Benz User Experience (MBUX) system, which features a voice-controlled smart-assistant that can be activated by saying "Hey Mercedes". It can display charging information and energy consumption figures. The navigation system can also suggest routes that include charging stations depending on the remaining charge of the battery, as well as simple destination entry using what3words.

Models 
The specifications include:

Safety 
The 2019 EQC received five stars overall in its Euro NCAP test.

References

External links 

 

EQC
Production electric cars
All-wheel-drive vehicles
Cars introduced in 2018
Compact sport utility vehicles
Luxury crossover sport utility vehicles
Euro NCAP small off-road
2020s cars
Mercedes-EQ